River Junction is an unincorporated community in Johnson County, Iowa, United States.

History
The community was named after its location at the confluence of the English and Iowa Rivers. River Junction was founded in 1873. Its population was 42 in 1902.

Notes

Unincorporated communities in Iowa County, Iowa
Unincorporated communities in Iowa
1873 establishments in Iowa